Lyari Development Authority (LDA) was established in 1993 by the Government of Sindh to oversee the development of Lyari, Karachi, Sindh, Pakistan. It was merged with the City District Government Karachi in 2001 but were reinstated after its dissolution.

See also 
 Hawksbay Scheme-42
 Lyari Town
 Karachi Improvement Trust 
 Karachi Metropolitan Corporation 
 Karachi Municipal Commission 
 Karachi Municipal Committee 
 Karachi Municipal Corporation
 City District Government of Karachi
 Karachi Development Authority
 Malir Development Authority

References

External links 
 
 Defunct Malir and Lyari development authorities restored after three years - Daily Times
Government of Karachi
Government agencies of Sindh